"It's a Little More Like Heaven" is a song written by Hoyt & Jim Atkins, sung by Hank Locklin, and released on the RCA Victor label. In April 1958, it peaked at No. 3 on Billboards country and western jockey chart. It spent 23 weeks on the charts and was also ranked No. 18 on Billboards 1958 year-end country and western chart.

Charts

Weekly charts

See also
 Billboard year-end top 50 country & western singles of 1958

References

Hank Locklin songs
1958 songs